The African Cup Winners' Cup 1977 was the third edition of Africa's secondary interclub competition. The tournament was played by 25 teams and used a knock-out format with ties played home and away. Enugu Rangers from Nigeria won the final, and claimed their first African club trophy.

First round

|}

1 Due to a scheduling error, Luo Union arrived for the 2nd leg on Friday night without four key players believing that the match was scheduled for the following night, and subsequently failed to travel to the stadium for the match. MO Constantine were awarded a 2-0 victory.

Second round

|}

Quarterfinals

|}

Semifinals

|}

Final

|}

Champion

External links
African Cup Winners' Cup results at Rec.Sport.Soccer Statistics Foundation

African Cup Winners' Cup
2